Ahmadabad (also Romanized as Aḩmadābād) is a village in Kenevist Rural District, in the Central District of Mashhad County, Razavi Khorasan Province, Iran. At the 2006 census, its population was 1,703, in 315 families.

See also 

 List of cities, towns and villages in Razavi Khorasan Province

References 

Populated places in Mashhad County